Yasutake is a masculine Japanese given name and a Japanese surname.

Possible writings
Yasutake can be written using many different combinations of kanji characters. Here are some examples:

靖健, "peaceful, healthy"
靖武, "peaceful, warrior"
靖丈, "peaceful, measure of length"
靖岳, "peaceful, mountain peak"
康健, "healthy, healthy"
康武, "healthy, warrior"
康丈, "healthy, measure of length"
康岳, "healthy, mountain peak"
安健, "tranquil, healthy"
安武, "tranquil, warrior"
保健, "preserve, healthy"
保武, "preserve, warrior"
保丈, "preserve, measure of length"
泰健, "peaceful, healthy"
泰岳, "peaceful, mountain peak"
易丈, "divination, measure of length"

The name can also be written in hiragana やすたけ or katakana ヤスタケ.

Notable people with the given name Yasutake
Yasutake Funakoshi (舟越 保武, 1912–2002), Japanese sculptor and painter
Yasutake Matsuoka (松岡 康毅, 1846–1923), Japanese politician

Notable people with the surname Yasutake
Patti Yasutake (パティ・ヤスタケ, born 1653), American actress
, Japanese footballer

Japanese-language surnames
Japanese masculine given names